Alberto Ghilardi (25 August 1909 – 30 June 1971) was an Italian cyclist who competed in the 1932 Summer Olympics. He won the gold medal in the team pursuit event.

Ghilardi started as a road racer and then changed to track. After the Olympics, he turned professional, but had little success and retired in 1936. After World War II he co-founded the Italian Federation of Athletes.

References

External links 
 
 
 

1909 births
1971 deaths
Italian male cyclists
Olympic cyclists of Italy
Cyclists at the 1932 Summer Olympics
Olympic gold medalists for Italy
Olympic medalists in cycling
Cyclists from Rome
Medalists at the 1932 Summer Olympics
Italian track cyclists